Benjamin F. Deming (August 12, 1790July 11, 1834) was an American merchant and politician. He served as a U.S. Representative from Vermont.

Biography
Deming was born in 1790 in Danville in the Vermont Republic; he pursued academic studies and became a merchant. He was the clerk of the Caledonia County Court from 1817 until 1833. From 1822 until 1833, he was the probate judge in Vermont, and he served as a member of the Governor's council from 1827 until 1832. Deming was elected as an Anti-Masonic candidate to the Twenty-third Congress, and served from March 4, 1833 until his death on July 11, 1834.

Personal life
He married Eunice Clark on June 6, 1816. They had five children together.

Death
In the summer of 1834, Deming became ill while in Washington, DC and decided to return home. He died in Saratoga Springs, New York en route to his home in Danville. He is interred at the Danville Green Cemetery.

See also
 List of United States Congress members who died in office (1790–1899)

References

External links
 Biographical Directory of the United States Congress
  – cenotaph at the Congressional Cemetery, Washington, DC
  – grave at the Danville Green Cemetery, Vermont
 Govtrack.us
 The Political Graveyard

1790 births
1834 deaths
People from Danville, Vermont
Anti-Masonic Party politicians from Vermont
Anti-Masonic Party members of the United States House of Representatives from Vermont
Vermont state court judges
19th-century American judges
Members of the United States House of Representatives from Vermont